Acrobasis texana is a species of snout moth in the genus Acrobasis. It was described by Herbert H. Neunzig  in 1986, and is known from the US state of Texas, from which its species epithet is derived.

References

Moths described in 1986
Acrobasis
Moths of North America